The 2016 ISSF World Cup is the annual edition of the ISSF World Cup in the Olympic shooting events, governed by the International Shooting Sport Federation.

Men's results

Rifle events

Pistol events

Shotgun events

Women's results

Rifle events

Pistol events

Shotgun events

Overall Medal Table

References

External links 
 Shooting Sport Federation
 Results

ISSF World Cup
ISSF
Shooting